Prometheus: The Discipline of Fire & Demise is the fourth studio album by Norwegian black metal band Emperor. It was released on 21 October 2001, through Candlelight Records. Prometheus: The Discipline of Fire & Demise differs from Emperor's previous recordings with a focus on a more progressive style.

The album was nominated for a Norwegian Grammy Award for Best Metal album in 2001.

Release and reception 

Prometheus: The Discipline of Fire & Demise failed to chart in North America and Europe. A music video was made for the song "Empty" and released on 8 October 2001.

The album received critical praise from music critics. Reviews from metal-based magazine Kerrang! declared it their album of the week on 10 October, comparing it to Metallica's Master of Puppets in terms of quality, while the magazine Terrorizer picked it as album of the month. John Serba of the online music database AllMusic praised the album, stating "Those willing to invest a significant amount of time into Prometheus will be thoroughly rewarded on intellectual and emotional levels [...] while more practical listeners unwilling to slap on headphones and willfully ingest the lyrics will find the record impenetrable", calling the album a "birth-to-death concept album of such weight and density that it takes roughly two dozen listens to even begin to appreciate the depth of its composition and its painstaking attention to detail."

In 2003, in a review of Emperor's compilation album Scattered Ashes: A Decade of Emperial Wrath, Dominique Leon of Pitchfork referred to Prometheus as "fairly amazing", and "arguably [Emperor's] most technically and compositionally complex album".

Track listing

Personnel 

 Ihsahn – vocals, lead and rhythm guitar, synthesizer, bass guitar, programming, arrangement and mixing
 Samoth – additional guitar
 Trym – drums and percussion

 Technical staff

 Thorbjørn Akkerhaugen – mixing
 Tom Kvålsvoll – mastering
 Christophe Szpajdel – logo

References 

2001 albums
Emperor (band) albums